Atom is a deprecated free and open-source text and source code editor for macOS, Linux, and Windows with support for plug-ins written in JavaScript, and embedded Git Control. Developed by GitHub, Atom was released on June 25, 2015. 

Most of the extending packages have free software licenses and are community-built and maintained.

On June 8, 2022, GitHub announced that Atom’s end-of-life would occur on December 15 of that year, "in order to prioritize technologies that enable the future of software development", specifically its GitHub Codespaces and Microsoft's Visual Studio Code.

Features 

Atom is a "hackable" text editor, which means it is customizable using HTML, CSS, and JavaScript.

Atom was a desktop application built using web technologies. It was based on the Electron framework, which was developed for that purpose, and hence was formerly called Atom Shell. Electron is a framework that enables cross-platform desktop applications using Chromium and Node.js. 

Atom was initially written in CoffeeScript and Less, but much of it has been converted to JavaScript.

Atom can apply syntax highlighting for multiple programming languages and file formats.

Packages 
Like most other configurable text editors, Atom enabled users to install third-party packages and themes to customize the features and looks of the editor. Packages can be installed, managed and published via Atom's package manager apm. All types of packages, including but not limited to: Syntactic highlighting support for languages other than the default, debuggers, etc. can be installed via apm.

History 
Atom was developed by GitHub as a text editor, and served as the basis Atom Shell which became the basis for Electron Framework.  

Facebook then developed the Nuclide and Atom IDE projects to turn Atom into an integrated development environment (IDE), but development on Nuclide and Atom IDE stopped in December 2018.

On June 8, 2022, GitHub announced shutdown of Atom development and archival of all development repositories of Atom by December 15, 2022.

Atom's founder, Nathan Sobo, has announced that he is building the "spiritual successor" to Atom, titled Zed. Unlike Atom, Zed will be written in Rust and will not be using the Electron framework.

On January 30, 2023, GitHub announced a breach which exposed "a set of encrypted code signing certificates" some of which were used to sign Atom releases. GitHub advised users to downgrade to earlier version of Atom signed with a different key.

A fork of the project was created, called Pulsar Editor.

License 
Initially, extension packages for Atom and anything not part of Atom's core were released under an open-source license. On May 6, 2014, the rest of Atom, including the core application, its package manager, as well as its desktop framework Electron, were released as free and open-source software under the MIT License.

Privacy concerns 
There was initially concern and discussion about two opt-out packages that report various data to external servers.
However, those packages are now opt-in with a verbose dialog at the initial launch:

Metrics package: Reports usage information to Google Analytics (As of version 1.31.0, this has been removed, now usage information is sent to GitHub's analytics pipeline directly.), including a unique UUID v4 random identifier. According to the authors, this is to determine the performance and know the most-used functions. This feature can be disabled by the user by opening the Settings View, searching for the metrics package, and disabling it.
Exception-reporting package: Reports uncaught Atom exceptions to www.bugsnag.com.

See also 

 List of text editors
 
 Comparison of HTML editors
 List of formerly proprietary software

References

External links 
 

Formerly proprietary software
Free text editors
Free and open-source software
Free integrated development environments
GitHub
HTML editors
JavaScript-based HTML editors
Linux text editors
MacOS text editors
Microsoft free software
Software using the MIT license
Text editors
Unix text editors
Windows text editors
XML editors
2014 software
Free HTML editors